Melody Moezzi (born March 4, 1979) is an Iranian-American writer and attorney. She writes and speaks about religion, public health, politics and culture. She is the author of The Rumi Prescription: How an Ancient Mystic Poet Changed My Modern Manic Life, Haldol and Hyacinths: A Bipolar Life and War on Error: Real Stories of American Muslims. Moezzi is a United Nations Global Expert and formerly the Executive Director of the Atlanta-based interfaith nonprofit "100 People of Faith".

Biography 
Moezzi has written for The New York Times, The Washington Post, CNN, Parabola, The Huffington Post, NPR, and Ms. magazine, among others. She was a columnist for the short-lived Muslim Girl Magazine. Moezzi speaks openly about having bipolar disorder and is a regular columnist and blogger for Bipolar Magazine.

Moezzi has appeared on several television and radio programs, including CNN, NPR, BBC, PRI and Air America. She founded the activist group Hooping for Peace. Moezzi holds degrees from Wesleyan University, Emory University School of Law, and Emory's Rollins School of Public Health.

Publications

Books

The Rumi Prescription: How an Ancient Mystic Poet Changed My Modern Manic Life, TarcherPerigee (2020).

Awards
 2007 Georgia Author of the Year Awards (GAYA) winner for Creative Non-Fiction (Essay) for War on Error
 2008 Gustavus Myers Book Award honorable mention for War on Error

References

Further reading

External links
 Official website of Melody Moezzi
 Hooping for Peace website
 CNN interview on the death of Neda Agha-Soltan

Living people
Wesleyan University alumni
Emory University School of Law alumni
American Muslims
HuffPost writers and columnists
American writers of Iranian descent
American women columnists
21st-century American women writers
21st-century American memoirists
Rollins School of Public Health alumni
1979 births
American women memoirists